"Rainy Monday" is the third single by rock group Shiny Toy Guns from their album We Are Pilots. This single peaked at #23 on the Modern Rock Tracks chart.

Music video
The music video shows the band performing the song, with Chad on vocals and guitar, Jeremy on keyboard, Mikey on drums and Carah on bass, with a girl appearing now and again. Every band member is wearing black clothes and has black hair in the video.

Usage in other media

It was featured on the British programme Waterloo Road.

Songs about weather
2008 singles
Shiny Toy Guns songs
2007 songs
Songs written by Gregori Chad Petree